Famous Impostors is the last of four non-fiction books completed by Bram Stoker, the author of Dracula. It features numerous historical impostors and hoaxes.

The first edition was published by the Sturgis & Walton Company of New York in November 1910. The British edition was published by Sidgwick & Jackson of London, also dated 1910, but printed in the United States. Newspaper and magazine coverage implies that it was published in January 1911.

Contents
Dashed (—) annotations are by Wikipedia.
 Pretenders
 Perkin Warbeck
 The Hidden King — Sebastian of Portugal
 Stephan Mali — Šćepan Mali
 The False Dauphins
 Princess Olive
Practitioners of Magic
 Paracelsus
 Cagliostro
 Mesmer
The Wandering Jew
John Law 
Witchcraft and Clairvoyance 
 Witches
 Doctor Dee
 La Voisin
 Sir Edward Kelley
 Mother Damnable
 Matthew Hopkins
Arthur Orton (Tichborne claimant)
 Women as Men
 The Motive for Disguise
 Hannah Snell
 La Maupin
 Mary East
Hoaxes, Etc. 
 Two London Hoaxes — includes the Berners Street hoax
 The Cat Hoax — a scam to buy cats brought to a certain address
 The Military Review — a false parade announced at 1812
 The Toll-Gate — a practical joke played by Charles Mayne Young for not paying a toll
 The Marriage Hoax — a marriage stopped by the false claim that the groom already had a wife and children
 Buried Treasure — a false treasure unearthed by a victim and a swindler, which gives his share to the victim in exchange for something of value
 Dean Swift's Hoax — an alleged letter written by a criminal about his accomplices and hideouts
 Hoaxed Burglars — thieves steal a secure box containing lead
 Bogus Sausages — sausages are discovered to be skins filled with bread
 The Moon Hoax
Chevalier d'Eon
The Bisley Boy — was Queen Elizabeth I of England a man?

References

External links
 Famous Impostors at Project Gutenberg
 
 Famous Impostors at BramStoker.org Full PDF version of Famous Impostors.

1910 non-fiction books
English non-fiction books
Hoaxes
Works by Bram Stoker